Earl "Dutch" Reibel (July 21, 1930 – January 3, 2007) was a Canadian ice hockey professional player. Reibel played primarily as a centre with the Detroit Red Wings, as well as the Chicago Black Hawks and Boston Bruins.

A member of two Stanley Cups with Detroit in 1954 and 1955, "Dutch" was also the only person to dethrone Gordie Howe as the Red Wings' leading scorer between the 1950 and 1964 seasons, surpassing him by 4 points in 1954–55.

He scored twice in the ninth All-Star Game for Detroit against the All-Stars on October 2, 1955. Following the winning goal in the second period he scored a last minute empty net goal to complete a 3–1 victory.

In regular season play, Reibel scored 84 goals and 161 assist for 245 points in 409 games. He recorded 6 goals and 14 assists for 20 points in 39 career playoff appearances. Reibel holds the record for most assists by a player in his first NHL game with 4 assists.  He was awarded the Lady Byng Trophy in 1956. 

"Dutch" Reibel died in his hometown, Kitchener, Ontario on January 3, 2007, from complications following a stroke.

Career statistics

Regular season and playoffs

References

External links

1930 births
2007 deaths
Boston Bruins players
Canadian ice hockey centres
Chicago Blackhawks players
Detroit Red Wings players
Edmonton Flyers (WHL) players
Ice hockey people from Ontario
Sportspeople from Kitchener, Ontario
Indianapolis Capitals players
Lady Byng Memorial Trophy winners
Omaha Knights (USHL) players
Providence Reds players
Stanley Cup champions
Windsor Spitfires players